Indrė Šerpytytė (' born 1983) is a Lithuanian artist living and working in London. Šerpytytė is concerned with the impact of war on history and perception, and works with photography, sculpture, installation and painting.

Her work is held by the Victoria and Albert Museum, David Roberts's Collection and Derwent London and have been exhibited at Tate Modern, The Museum of Modern Art (MoMA), The Photographers' Gallery, Museum of Contemporary Art in Kraków and Museum Folkwang, among others.

Life and work
Šerpytytė was born in 1983 in Palanga, Lithuania and moved to London at the age of 14. She received her MA in photography from The Royal College of Art, London and her BA in editorial photography from the University of Brighton.

(1944 – 1991)
Former NKVD - MVD - MGB - KGB Buildings (2009 - 2015, ongoing) centres on the after-effects of World War II in Lithuania. These black and white images tell an almost forgotten story of the domestic conflicts of war, in which people were interrogated and tortured in what were once family homes. Rather than representing the buildings themselves, or showing the inhabitants or victims directly, Šerpytytė uses commissioned, hand-carved wooden models based on archival research and site visits to comment on both the physical and humanitarian scale of the conflict and to recall events that have faded over time. From the same series, Forest Brothers (2009) looks at the Lithuanian forest as a place both to hide and to disappear as it revisits the environments once home to the period's most active resistance force.

A State of Silence
A State of Silence (2006) pays tribute to the artist's father, Albinas Šerpytis, Lithuania's Head of Government Security, who died in suspicious circumstances in a car accident in the early hours of October 13, 2001.

2 Seconds of Colour
The large scale photographic palettes of 2 Seconds of Colour arise from a Google Image search for the term ‘Isis beheadings’. The works present the patchwork of rectangular placeholders automatically generated while the page is loading, their colours extracted from the 'black of the executioner’s garments, the orange of the victim’s jumpsuit [or] the blue of the sky’. Responding to the oversaturated media landscape in which they find themselves, the images 'seeking to break the closed circuit between violence that is thoughtlessly executed and violence that is thoughtlessly consumed'.

150 mph
The 150 mph paintings depart from images of individuals jumping from New York's World Trade Center during the September 11 attacks. Each image’s human subject has been removed leaving the architecture itself as sole "witness and unintentional memorial."

Publications

Publications by Šerpytytė
(1944 – 1991). London: self-published, 2010. . Includes an interview with Martin Barnes and a text by Nigel Rolfe.

Publications with others
Pokario Istorijos / Post-war Stories. Kaunas, Lithuania: Lithuanian Photographers’ Association Kaunas Department, 2015. By Šerpytytė ("Forest Brothers: Former NKVD-MVD-MGB-KGB Buildings"), Claudia Heinermann ("Wolf Children") and Michal Iwanowski ("Clear of People"). . With a text by Sonya Winterberg ("Wolf Children"). Published to accompany an exhibition. English and Lithuanian language.

Awards
Jerwood Photography Award, Jerwood Visual Arts, Jerwood Foundation, 2006
The Terry O’Neill Award, 2007
The Fujifilm Distinction Award, 2008
National Media Museum Photography Bursary, 2009
Hoopers Gallery Prize, 2009
Metro Imaging Prize, 2009
Magenta Foundation Flash Forward Prize, 2010
Nominated for the Rencontres d’Arles Discovery Award by Simon Baker, Tate Senior Curator, International Art (Photography), 2011
Shortlisted for The Arts Foundation’s Still Life Photography Award, 2013

Exhibitions

Solo exhibitions
The Embassy of the Republic of Lithuania, London, 2009.
Camera 16, Milan, 2010
Vilniaus Fotografijos Galerija, Vilnius, 2011
The Photographers' Gallery, London, 2010
Ffotogallery, Penarth, 2013;
Kraków Photomonth Festival, Museum of Contemporary Art in Kraków (MOCAK), 2015

Group exhibitions
The Photographers' Gallery, London
Victoria and Albert Museum, London
Rencontres d’Arles, Arles, France, 2011
National Gallery of Art, Vilnius, 2013
Street Level Photoworks, Glasgow, UK
Conflict, Time, Photography, Tate Modern, London, 2014–2015.
Museum Folkwang, Essen, 2015
Tbilisi Photo Festival
Ocean of Images, Museum of Modern Art (MoMA), New York, 2015–2016

Collections
Šerpytytė 's work is held in the following public collections:
 Victoria and Albert Museum, London 
 David Roberts Collection, David Roberts Art Foundation, London
 The collection of Jay Jopling, London
 Derwent London, London

References

Living people
1983 births
20th-century Lithuanian women artists
21st-century Lithuanian women artists
20th-century women photographers
21st-century women photographers
Alumni of the Royal College of Art
British contemporary artists
Documentary photographers
Lithuanian photographers
Lithuanian women photographers
Lithuanian women journalists
Lithuanian expatriates in the United Kingdom
People from Palanga
Women photojournalists